Jang Jin-young (born July 1, 1983) is a South Korean singer and the former lead singer of the boy group Black Beat. He is currently more active as a vocal trainer for SM Entertainment's artists, particularly SHINee, EXO and Red Velvet.

Career
Jang Jin-young made his debut as the lead singer of the boy group Black Beat which was formed by S.M. Entertainment in 2002. The five-member group released their first album Volume 1 - Black Beat #2002 but has been inactive since 2006. He also became a member of the duo 'by JINSUNG' before debuting in 2011 as a solo artist with the release of the single "시간이 흐른 뒤 (Another Time)" and mini album Vocalist. He participated as a vocal trainer for S.M. Entertainment in the reality-survival show, K-pop Star and gained popularity in 2017 after appearing in the second season of Sister's Slam Dunk where he earned the nickname "지충쌤" or "Mr. Serious" for his training style. On June 23, he collaborated with The Barberettes for the song "Stranger's Love" which was released as part of the second season of SM Station, a special digital music project in which S.M. Entertainment releases a single every week. In July, he became a vocal trainer for the Mnet reality girl group survival show, Idol School along with S.E.S member Bada.

Personal life
In April 2017, Jang Jin-young announced his plans to marry his girlfriend of 10 years, actress Kang Hae-in (강해인), in October. They were wed on October 21 at a ceremony attended by the couple's family, friends and other S.M. Entertainment artists.

Discography

Extended plays

Singles

Filmography

Television shows

References

1983 births
Living people
21st-century South Korean  male singers
South Korean male idols
SM Entertainment people
Place of birth missing (living people)